The 1962 NBA draft was the 16th annual draft of the National Basketball Association (NBA). The draft was held on March 26, 1962, before the 1962–63 season. In this draft, nine NBA teams took turns selecting amateur U.S. college basketball players. A player who had finished his four-year college eligibility was eligible for selection. If a player left college early, he would not be eligible for selection until his college class graduated. In each round, the teams selected in reverse order of their won–loss record in the previous season. Before the draft, a team could forfeit its first-round draft pick, then select any player from within a 50-mile radius of its home arena as their territorial pick. The Chicago Packers, who finished last in the previous season, were renamed the Chicago Zephyrs. The Philadelphia Warriors relocated to San Francisco and became the San Francisco Warriors prior to the start of the season. The draft consisted of 16 rounds, comprising 102 players selected.

Draft selections and draftee career notes
Dave DeBusschere and Jerry Lucas were selected before the draft as the 'Detroit Pistons' and 'Cincinnati Royals' territorial picks, respectively. Bill McGill from the University of Utah was selected first overall by the Chicago Zephyrs. Terry Dischinger from Purdue University, who went on to win the Rookie of the Year Award in his first season, was selected eight overall by the Chicago Zephyrs. Four players from this draft, DeBusschere, Lucas, seventh pick John Havlicek and twelfth pick Chet Walker, have been inducted to the Basketball Hall of Fame. They were also named in the 50 Greatest Players in NBA History list announced at the league's 50th anniversary in 1996. Lucas initially opted to sign for the Cleveland Pipers of the American Basketball League (ABL). However, the Pipers folded before the start of the season and Lucas opted to sit out a year to complete his education. He eventually entered the NBA and went on to win the Rookie of the Year Award in the 1963–64 season. Lucas' achievements include an NBA championship with the New York Knicks in 1973, 5 All-NBA Team selections and 7 All-Star Game selections. DeBusschere's achievements include 2 NBA championships with the Knicks in 1970 and 1973, 1 All-NBA Team selection, 8 All-Star Game selections and 6 All-Defensive Team selections. In the 1964–65 season, he was named as a player-coach for the Pistons, becoming the youngest head coach in the NBA at the age of 24. He coached the Pistons for almost three years before returning to a full-time player. He also had a brief professional baseball career with the Chicago White Sox. He played two seasons in the Major League Baseball in 1962 and 1963, and another season in the minor-league before he gave up his dual-sport career to focus on basketball. He is one of only 12 athletes who have played in both NBA and MLB. Havlicek spent all of his 16-year playing career with the Boston Celtics. His achievements include 8 NBA championships with the Celtics, 1 Finals MVP, 11 All-NBA Team selection, 13 All-Star Game selections and 8 All-Defensive Team selections. Walker, the 12th pick, won the NBA championship with the Philadelphia 76ers in 1967 and was selected to 7 All-Star Games.

Zelmo Beaty, the 3rd pick, played in both NBA and American Basketball Association (ABA). He was selected to 2 NBA All-Star Games, 3 ABA All-Star Games and 3 All-ABA Teams. Dischinger and 4th pick Len Chappell are the only other players from this draft who have been selected to an All-Star Game. During his stint with the Detroit Pistons, Dischinger served as an interim player-coach for two games in 1971. Wayne Hightower, the 5th pick, had left college after his junior year in 1961. He wasn't eligible to be drafted until his college class had graduated, therefore he spent a year playing in the Spanish League with Real Madrid. In his only season there, he helped Real Madrid to a Spanish League title and to the European Champions Cup final. Reggie Harding, the 29th pick, became the first player drafted out of high school when the Detroit Pistons selected him in the fourth round. However, he did not enter the league until the 1963–64 season due to the rules that prevent a high school player to play in the league until one year after his high school class graduated. He was drafted again in the 1963 Draft by the Pistons with the 48th pick in the sixth round.

Kevin Loughery, the 11th pick, had a stint as a player-coach with the Philadelphia 76ers in 1973. At the end of the season, he retired from playing and moved to the ABA to coach the New York Nets. He won 2 ABA championships with the Nets in 1974 and 1976. He then moved to the NBA with the Nets after the ABA–NBA merger. He coached 6 NBA teams, most recently with the Miami Heat. Don Nelson, the 17th pick, played 14 seasons in the NBA, winning 5 NBA championships with the Celtics. He became a head coach soon after retiring as a player in 1976. He coached 4 NBA teams, most recently with the Golden State Warriors. He held the record for most wins as a head coach, surpassing Lenny Wilkens' previous record of 1,332 wins. He won the Coach of the Year Award for a record three times, tied with Pat Riley. He was also named among the Top 10 Coaches in NBA History announced at the league's 50th anniversary in 1996.

Key

Draft

Other picks
The following list includes other draft picks who have appeared in at least one NBA game.

Notable undrafted players
These players were not selected in the 1962 draft but played at least one game in the NBA.

Notes

See also
 List of first overall NBA draft picks

References
General

Specific

External links
NBA.com
NBA.com: NBA Draft History

Draft
National Basketball Association draft
NBA draft
NBA draft
Basketball in New York City
Sporting events in New York City